The Republic of Abkhazia is a partially recognized state in the South Caucasus that declared independence from Georgia during the War in Abkhazia (1992–1993). At the time, the Soviet Union had only just recently collapsed (in 1991). Since 1992, Abkhazia has sought recognition as a sovereign state from the international community. Abkhazia is considered by most of the international community to be part of Georgia.

Abkhazia maintains relations with 5 United Nations (UN) member states and 3 other partially recognized states. Transnistria – claimed by Moldova – recognized Abkhazia on 22 January 1993, and Abkhazia reciprocated. Subsequently, Abkhazia arranged mutual recognitions with South Ossetia (on 20 September 2005) – also claimed by Georgia – and Artsakh (on 14 November 2006) – claimed by Azerbaijan. Abkhazia was central to the Russo-Georgian War (12 days in August 2008), alongside South Ossetia. Shortly after the war, Russia recognized Abkhazia (26 August 2008), the first UN member state to do so.

As of October 2022, Abkhazia has obtained and retains recognition from four other UN member states: Nicaragua (5 September 2008), Venezuela (10 September 2009), Nauru (15 December 2009), and Syria (31 May 2018). Abkhazia has also obtained recognition from a few states that have revoked that recognition later on; these include Vanuatu (2011–2013) and Tuvalu (2011–2014). Abkhazia maintains unofficial contacts with a few other countries: Northern Cyprus (2008) (claimed by Cyprus), Belarus (2008, 2009, 2020), Italy (2011), San Marino (2011), Eritrea (2014), North Korea (2017, 2018), Iran (2021), and Yemen (2021).

The Donetsk People's Republic and the Luhansk People's Republic arranged mutual recognition with Abkhazia in early 2022, but they were annexed by Russia on 30 September 2022.

Relations with sovereign states and partially recognized states

Relations with subnational entities

States that have withdrawn recognition 

 - March 2014.
 - June 2011, reiterated in March 2013 and March 2019.

Foreign policy 
Even though Abkhazia has not been recognized by many states, it has unofficial relations with several UN member states. It engages often unofficially with states. Often, the Circassian diaspora is used as a mean to establish links to states of the Middle East.

Belarus 

According to the Deputy Prime Minister of Abkhazia, Kan Taniya, the Abkhaz relations to Belarus are high on the priority list of Abkhazia. In 1995, Belarus was opposed to the CIS sanctions against Abkhazia. Bilateral relations between Belarus and Georgia were strained during the Georgian Presidency of Mikheil Saakashvili, during which Abkhazia was recognised by Russia. In March 2009, President Lukashenko referred to Abkhaz president Sergey Bagapsh as "the President of Abkhazia" in an official statement when the two met in Moscow. The two discussed economic cooperation, with Lukashenko stating "much work emerges after gaining independence, we would be happy if Belarus' involvement could help to solve problems in this region." In November 2009, Belarusian lawmakers visited Tbilisi, Sukhumi, and Tskhinvali on simultaneous fact-finding missions to inform a decision on whether to recognise Abkhazia and South Ossetia. Despite these actions and Russian pressure, Belarus never recognised Abkhazia and South Ossetia. Bilateral relations between Belarus and Georgia improved over the same period, and in April 2015 – during the Georgian Presidency of Giorgi Margvelashvili – Lukashenko paid his first official visit to Georgia, during which he explicitly noted his support of Georgia's territorial integrity. Since then, Georgia buys Belarus tractors "and other equipment that we would not otherwise buy", according to Georgian economist Paata Sheshelidze. In 2021, an OSCE expert guessed that Belarus might be one of the next countries to recognize Abkhazia.

Eritrea 
In June 2014, the Ambassador Extraordinary and Plenipotentiary of the State of Eritrea in the Russian Federation Teklay Minassie Asgedom and Head of the Department of Asia and the Pacific of the Ministry of Foreign Affairs of the State of Eritrea Kalekristos Zariseney Gebreyezus met with a delegation from Abkhazia.

Israel 
In 2004, Abkhazia asked Israel to recognize the country. Six years later, mutual visits became more frequent. In 2011, a delegation of the Israeli security firm Global CST visited Abkhazia. Representatives of Global CST declared their readiness to provide non-offensive military technologies, security equipment, and medicine, as well as invest into the agricultural sector, tourism, and mining. In 2017, Abkhaz foreign minister Daur Kove visited Israel and participated in an international round table "Status of the unrecognized states and their relations with Israel" which took place in Tel Aviv University on 8 November 2017. During his trip, Kove held a number of working meetings including with Alon Davidi, the Mayor of Sderot and with Alexander Shane, the Ambassador of the Russian Federation to Israel.

North Korea 
In December 2017, the North Korean Chamber of Commerce contacted then-Abkhaz prime minister Gennadi Gagulia. Subsequently, an Abkhaz delegation visited Pyongyang (August 2018) and a North Korean delegation visited Sukhumi (November 2018). According to the Director of International Relations at the Chamber of Commerce of North Korea, companies of the construction business, the food and textile industry, logistics companies are interested in working with Abkhazia. Additionally, North Korean workers could be sent to the Black Sea country. In 2019, about 400 North Korean workers settled in Abkhazia. In 2021, an OSCE expert guessed that North Korea might be one of the next countries to recognize Abkhazia. Abkhazia rejects a diplomatic recognition by North Korea solely for geopolitical reasons.

Turkey 

The most cordial of the Abkhaz relations with UN member states without official diplomatic recognition are with Turkey. Turkey does not follow the Georgian embargo rules and the country hosts a large Abkhaz diaspora.

United States 
In 2008, the United States government of George W. Bush informally tried to establish contacts with the Abkhaz government.

Partially recognized states 
The Sahrawi Arab Democratic Republic, and the Turkish Republic of Northern Cyprus welcomed Russian recognition of Abkhazia.

In 2007, members of the parliaments and civil society organizations from Northern Cyprus and Western Sahara observed the Abkhazian parliamentary election.

Visa problems 
Several states which do not recognise Abkhazia routinely refuse visa applications of Abkhazians, even though the application is made in Moscow on the basis of the person's dual Russian citizenship.

In October 2006 the American embassy denied a visa to Minister for Foreign Affairs of Abkhazia Sergei Shamba, who was to attend a UN Security Council discussion in New York City on the United Nations Observer Mission in Georgia.

In February 2009 the Indian embassy denied visas to two Abkhazian women employed by the Ministry of Foreign Affairs who had been invited by the Jawaharlal Nehru University to attend an international conference. In response, Foreign Minister Shamba sent letters to Indian External Affairs Minister Pranab Mukherjee and to the Ambassador of India to Russia, Prabhat Prakash Shukla. The letters protested the very unfriendly attitude towards Abkhazia, pointed out that the applicants’ Russian citizenship had not been taken into account and warned that Abkhazia might respond in kind, denying visas to any future Indian visitors.

On 17 March 2009 the Spanish embassy in Moscow refused visas for the members of the Abkhazian Futsal team, which was to take part in the first Copa de les Nacions de Futsal in Catalonia.

On 13 May 2009, the German embassy in Russia initially denied a visa for a sick Abkhazian 16-year-old boy who was to undergo a complicated operation in a Munich clinic. Foreign Minister of Abkhazia Sergei Shamba said "such actions are out of line with universal humanitarian principles and are a direct violation of Abkhazian residents' rights." However, the next day the German embassy in Moscow issued the visa, stating that the delay was due to the need to coordinate with their consulate in Tbilisi, which normally handles visas.

Diplomatic missions

Offices in Abkhazia

Abkhazian missions

Membership in international organizations 
Abkhazia belongs to the Unrepresented Nations and Peoples Organization (UNPO) and Community for Democracy and Human Rights.

Cooperation with international organizations 
In 2012, the Abkhaz foreign minister signed a Memorandum of Understanding with a representative of ALBA.

International economic relations 

The National Bank of the Republic of Abkhazia has maintained its baseline interest rate for 11 years. Debt is negligible, external liabilities are just 5.6 per cent of GDP, and Abkhazia has never reported a balance of payments deficit.

See also 

 Foreign relations of South Ossetia

Notes

References

External links 
The Ministry of Foreign Affairs of the Republic of Abkhazia website